Hoanghoniinae is a subfamily of adapiform primate that lived in Asia during the middle to late Eocene.

References

Literature cited

 
 
 

Prehistoric strepsirrhines
Prehistoric mammals of Asia
Fossil taxa described in 1994
Eocene primates
Eocene first appearances
Eocene extinctions
Mammal subfamilies